"Mail Call" is a bugle call which signals personnel to assemble for the distribution of mail.

References
bands.army.mil

Bugle calls
Military mail